TWA Flight 840 was a regularly scheduled Trans World Airlines flight. 

The flight was twice attacked by Palestinian terrorists:
 TWA Flight 840 hijacking, a hijacking in 1969
 TWA Flight 840 bombing, a bombing in 1986

840
Flight number disambiguation pages